Trioceros marsabitensis, Tilbury's chameleon, Mount Marsabit chameleon, or Mount Marsabit one-horned chameleon, is a species of chameleon endemic to Kenya.

References

Trioceros
Reptiles described in 1991
Taxa named by Colin R. Tilbury
Reptiles of Kenya